Percis is a genus of poachers native to the northern Pacific Ocean.

Species
There are currently two recognized species in this genus:
 Percis japonica (Pallas, 1769) (Dragon poacher)
 Percis matsuii Matsubara, 1936

References

Hypsagoninae
 
Taxa named by Giovanni Antonio Scopoli